Jose Luis Arribas Granados (born 14 January 1975 in Madrid) is a vision impaired B2/S12 swimmer from Spain. He competed at the 1996 Summer Paralympics, winning a silver medal in the breaststroke.

References

External links 
 
 

1975 births
Living people
Spanish male breaststroke swimmers
Paralympic swimmers of Spain
Paralympic silver medalists for Spain
Paralympic medalists in swimming
Swimmers at the 1996 Summer Paralympics
Medalists at the 1996 Summer Paralympics
Swimmers from Madrid
S12-classified Paralympic swimmers